KAPG may refer to:

 KRQA, a radio station (88.1 FM) licensed to Bentonville, Arkansas, United States, which held the call sign KAPG from 1996 to 2016
 Phillips Army Airfield (ICAO code KAPG)